A bicycle lock is a security device used to deter bicycle theft, either by simply locking one of the wheels or by fastening the bicycle to a fixed object, e.g., a bike rack.

Quick-release levers, as used on some bicycle wheels and seatpost fasteners, are a security vulnerability, because they allow the wheels and saddle to be easily removed. Unless such easily removable components are secured while the bicycle is unattended, they are vulnerable to theft. Sensible locking strategies address this by locking these components in addition to the frame, or by taking the vulnerable components, such as quick-release front wheels, away from the bicycle.

Locking devices vary in size and security, the most secure tending to be the largest, heaviest and least portable. Thus, like other security equipment, bicycle locks must balance the competing interests of security, portability, and cost. Some are made of particularly expensive materials chosen for their acceptable strength and low density.

An alternate defense is the provision of bicycle lockers or a bike cage in which the whole bicycle is locked, but these are uncommon in some countries. A bike locker is not a bicycle lock.

Test standards that rate the effective security of bicycle locks are provided by Thatcham and Sold Secure in the United Kingdom, ART in the Netherlands, SSF in Sweden, and VDS in Germany. Tests carried out by the Cyclists' Touring Club showed that all of the locks under test could be broken in less than 42 seconds using either bolt cutters for a cable/chain or a bottle jack for D-locks.

Types

U-locks and D-locks

A U-lock is a rigid metal ring in the shape of the letter U. The U part of the lock attaches to a crossbar section, and for this reason they are also called D-locks. To lock the bicycle, one locks it physically to some other object, such as a bike rack, parking meter or other pole installed securely in the solid ground. Merely locking the bike frame to the wheel is not recommended because, although it cannot be rolled away,  the entire bicycle can still be lifted and carried away.

U-locks are more secure than most other kinds of locking mechanism because they are more resistant to cutting with high-leverage hand tools such as bolt cutters. However, most are still vulnerable to at least one type of exploit. For instance, if there is enough space for a thief to fit a jack into the U, the jack can produce enough leverage to break the lock. Another common brute force method to break open U-locks is to use a long length (perhaps 2 metre) of pipe to twist the lock open (although this method is more commonly used to defeat chain and cable locks). Like all locks, U-Locks are vulnerable to power tools such as portable angle grinders.  A quality U-lock will advertise the material's hardness (relative resistance to grinding), its resistance to prying (expressed in tonnes, or pounds; for example, one might resist to 5 tonnes, which exceeds the 2-tonne capacity of a common car jack), as well as resistance to drilling into the keyhole itself.

For a time, many U-locks used a tubular pin tumbler lock. However, most tubular locks can be picked by thieves using a common disposable Bic pen. U-locks with tubular pin tumblers should be avoided, though most manufacturers no longer offer them.

A very similar type of lock, often referred to as an O-lock, or a "bike club," is a retracting shackle lock. This lock may be more protective as it does not leave space for thieves to insert tools like a car jack which would burst a normal u-lock.

Chain
A chain lock is a chain with a lock. It often has a key or a combination lock attached to it. A long enough chain can pass through both wheels, the frame and attach the bicycle to an immovable object. Because of their inherent flexibility, chains are easier to secure around tricky-shaped objects than D-locks.

Chains vary widely in their security level. If the chain is bought from a hardware store, it is most likely made from basic iron or steel and can easily be cut with a relatively inexpensive pair of bolt cutters. Chains specifically designed for bike security are often case hardened and may feature Hexagonal or Trapezoidal link surfaces more impervious to hand tools.

A chain is only as strong as its weakest link, which may be the lock itself. Although a cheap keyed or combination lock may be an appropriate match for a hardware store chain, a case-hardened security chain necessitates a specialized lock such as a monobloc padlock or mini u-lock. Compared to other locks, chains tend to be the heaviest solution, especially in the case of long and/or tough chains.

Cable locks

Cable locks are in many ways similar to chain locks. Cable locks often come with the locking mechanism already permanently integrated. Otherwise, a length of cable with loops on both ends can also be used.

The main advantage of cable locks over chains is the ease of transporting them. Simple cable locks, however, are only sufficient for use in low-risk areas. Even the largest diameter unprotected cable can be quickly cut with bolt cutters. More robust cable locks have overlapping steel jackets threaded over the cable. This can make it more difficult to cut the central cable.

Many cyclists use a long cable to secure bicycle components (such as the wheels or seat) in conjunction with a U-lock or padlock to secure the frame.  Special strong cables are available which are made with a loop at each end continuous with the cable, which enable linking with a locking device.

A common design flaw among low-quality combination-lock cables allows thieves to peer into the grooves between the disks. This allows them to decipher the unlock combination while cycling through the individual numbers on each disk. Also, if the number of disks is low, the thief doesn't even need to peer into it and can simply use a brute-force attack (try every combination until it opens).

Wheel lock

Also called an O-lock, ring-lock or frame lock. This is a low security mechanism mounted on the frame that immobilizes the rear wheel by moving a steel bolt through the spokes to prevent motion.

An O-lock prevents riding the bicycle but does not, by itself, secure the bicycle to a stationary object. This type of lock is effective and convenient for securing a bicycle against opportunistic theft, when the bike is left unattended momentarily. It forces the thief to carry the bicycle. It is a common way to secure bicycles when someone is at home, if their company provides indoor bicycle parking, and at railway station parking in the Netherlands.

The O-lock also conveniently secures the rear wheel: only locking the frame is needed, to secure both the frame and the rear wheel. Used in addition to a U-lock it can be a convenient second lock. Some models have an optional cable or chain that plugs into the body of the lock to enable the bicycle to be secured as well.

Locking skewers

Locking skewers replace the existing quick release skewers on a bicycle's wheels and Seatpost clamp (quick release skewers enable removal without tools). This reduces the need to lock these parts of the bike since now their removal requires tools. One type of locking skewer uses the same design as a normal Quick release skewer, except after clamping the skewer the (keyed) handle may be removed.

Another type of locking skewer uses a uniquely shaped nut that can only be turned using the matching socket/key, which is typically a wrench-like tool that is small enough to fit on a keychain. Though expensive, locking skewers provide additional security and convenience. Locking wheels with an additional U-Lock or removing the front wheel and locking it to the frame and rear wheel would provide the highest security. A disadvantage is that if the owner loses the special tool then they will not be able to undo the skewer, and will need to obtain a spare tool from the manufacturer. The same type of uniquely shaped nut used for the locking skewer can also be found for suspension forks, V-brakes, and solid-axle wheels in addition to regular wheels and seatposts. Manufacturers such as Pitlock and Pinhead offer services to supply additional lock nuts to an existing key number registered by the owner.

Since a couple of years there is also another innovation on the market that offers security for the different bike parts, Hexlox. Hexlox is a small lock that is directly inserted into an already existing Hex Bolt and prevents the access to it. The system works with different coded keys and can be used for 4mm, 5mm, 6mm and 8mm Hex Bolts. Additionally Hexlox also offers specially designed skewers, thru axles and wheel nuts, that are all are Hexlox Ready. They are all tighten with a normal Hex Key / Allen Key, which makes it possible to use normal tools for changing or removing parts of the bikes, when not secured.

Even though a determined thief could eventually defeat the skewer's lock nut by using a power tool, e.g. by grinding a screwdriver slot into it or simply cutting it off, locking skewers provide convenient protection against theft of bicycle parts in areas where locked bicycles should not be left unattended for long periods of time.  The highest quality products currently found on the market use stainless steel to avoid a number of disadvantages presented by carbon steel and aluminum including corrosion (rust) and damage to the locking mechanism's unique key indentations caused by key slip-out.

Less expensive options include replacing standard quick release skewers with skewers that need a standard Hex key to be opened.  Despite hex keys not being very rare, this method still guards the bicycle from casual opportunists, needing the less common tool and more time to be removed. Pentagonal key skewers exist which bring some of the benefit of a locking skewer at a lower cost.  Quicker and cheaper yet, and only effective against thieves unequipped with even a screwdriver, quick-release levers can be tied down by a common Hose clamp.

Another cost-effective approach to wheel security is to replace the front and rear quick-release skewers with a long stud, such as manufactured by BikeRegistry. This approach secures one end of the stud with a permanently attached acorn nut; the other end is secured by double nylon-insert nuts and washers which allow the entire assembly to spin freely if wheel removal is attempted. (This can thwart someone carrying a single wrench, but is trivially defeated by using a wrench on each end.)

Wheels are also commonly secured by use of a wheel tether, which is basically a flexible steel cable with a noose swaged on either end. This type cable does not require its own lock. It is secured by the main security device, which may be a security chain, u-lock or even another cable device.

Smart locks 
Smart locks use Bluetooth technology to allow a lock to be unlocked with a smartphone, and can send a notification if they are breached. Several smart bicycle locks have been produced through crowdfunding and sold as consumer products. Some bicycle-sharing systems also use them. Smart locks introduce added security risks through the possibility of hacking.

Disc rotor locks 
Disc brakes are a popular braking system for bicycles, most notable for mountain bikes but recently there has been an increase in their popularity for road bikes, especially after the UCI approved them for use in professional races in May 2018.

Disc rotor locks have been popular for motorcyclists for many years but with the proliferation of bicycles now using them smaller, more compact versions for bicycles have been created. They work by inserting a metal pin through the hole in the disc rotor between the seatstay and chainstay, preventing the wheel from rotating and virtually immobilising the rear wheel. The locks themselves are small, metal devices that sit around the edge of the disc rotor and are locked with a key insertion.

Standards and tests
Test standards that rate the effective security of bicycle locks are provided by various companies and organizations, depending on location.

In the U.K., a lock certified by Sold Secure or Thatcham is usually required in order to insure a bicycle or motorcycle against theft.

Tests carried out on behalf of Cycle magazine showed that all of the bicycle locks tested, which had a variety of certifications, could be broken in less than 42 seconds. Cables and chains were breached using either small cable cutters or 36" bolt croppers, and D-locks were breached using a stubby bottle jack. Of the locks tested, five had a Sold Secure Gold rating, varying in price from £25 to £100. Two of these Gold rated locks withstood only 10 seconds of attack.

The Dutch consumer news show Kassa 3 published a four-minute show in which a former bicycle thief removed eight consumer-grade locks (cheaper than €30 / ~$40) from a bike in times ranging from 10 to a maximum of 84 seconds. The locks included those from manufacturers ABUS, Hema and Halfords.

Effectiveness

Bicycle locks are only effective when they are used on secure objects. For example, a bicycle lock is useless when connected to a "sucker pole", which is a pole that gives the biker the appearance of security. A bicycle thief may target the bicycle because the pole can be quickly and easily dismantled, even in broad daylight.

Direct action
Bike locks can be used as part of a direct action. In the UK, protesters have used bike locks to chain themselves to structures. The most common type of bike locks used in direct action are D-Locks because the shape lends itself to loop around a piece of machinery and a protester's neck.

See also

References

External links 

 Locks tested by ART Foundation

Lock
Locks (security device)
Bicycle parking